Gare de Lannion is a railway station serving the town Lannion, Côtes-d'Armor department, western France. It is the northern terminus of the Plouaret–Lannion railway. The railway line between Plouaret and Lannion has been electrified in 2000. A new station has been built in Lannion.

Services

The station is served by high speed trains to Rennes and Paris, and regional trains to Saint-Brieuc and Morlaix.

At the station connection with the Tibus network, a coach service running between Lannion, Trébeurden, Trégastel and Perros-Guirec, is possible.

At the cinema
The former Lannion Station can be seen at the end of the 1946 movie La Bataille du rail (The Battle of the Rails).

References

Railway stations in Côtes-d'Armor
TER Bretagne
Railway stations in France opened in 1881